Ian Harold Beckles (born July 20, 1967) is a Canadian former American football Guard who played nine seasons in the NFL. Beckles was the co-host of the highly-rated Beckles and Recher Show on iHeartMedia, Inc.'s WDAE (620 AM and 95.3 FM) in Tampa, Florida. Beckles was the host of his own program (The Ian Beckles Show) on 102.5 The Bone on Sundays from 11-1 p.m.

Early Years to College
Beckles' family emigrated to Canada in 1964. His mother (who passed in early 2009) was native of Guyana, while his father hails from Trinidad. Beckles grew up with his mother in a single-parent home in Montreal and played hockey and baseball as a youth (among his friends was future NFL fullback and Buc teammate Alonzo Highsmith). However, after playing football in high school, Beckles excelled and went on to play junior college football at Waldorf College in Forest City, Iowa, earning all-conference honors as a sophomore.

Beckles later transferred to Indiana, and became a standout guard during the 1989 season—his only as a starter. During Beckles' senior year, Indiana produced one of nation's top rushing attacks (214.5 yards per game). Beckles blocked for future NFL quarterback Trent Green, running backs Vaughn Dunbar (an NFL first-round pick) and Anthony Thompson (American football) (who won the Maxwell Award player of the year award in 1989), and Ernie Thompson, and alongside standout center Ron Vargo, who played briefly for the Arena League's Columbus franchise in the early 1990s. Beckles received attention from NFL scouts as a senior when they turned to film from Indiana to scout, primarily, Thompson. As the team's primary pulling lineman, Beckles stood out on film.

Beckles graduated from IU with a BS in business.

Professional Football
Following Indiana, Beckles was drafted in the fifth round of the 1990 NFL draft, the first round of the 1990 CFL draft, and started immediately for the Tampa Bay Buccaneers at right guard. The rookie was a bright addition to an interior line that had struggled with guards Tom McHale, John Bruhin and Carl Bax.

Beckles became a mainstay during his seven seasons with the Bucs, along with left tackle Paul Gruber and centre Tony Mayberry, while the left guard and right tackle positions were in flux from season to season. During his time, the Bucs had 1,000 yard rushers and Reggie Cobb (1992) and Errict Rhett (1994, 1995). Beckles, who wore jersey no. 62, departed as a free agent after the 1996 season, inking a deal with Philadelphia.

Beckles started two seasons for the Eagles at right guard alongside players such as right tackle Richard Cooper, centres Steve Everitt and Bubba Miller and swingmen Jermaine Mayberry and Jerry Crafts, before signing with the Jets in 1999. Ricky Watters had 1,000 yard seasons in each of Beckles' seasons as a starter with Philadelphia under offensive coordinator Jon Gruden.

His time with the Jets was brief, however, as he was released prior to the season as the Jets elected to go with young guards Randy Thomas (right side, a rookie) and Kerry Jenkins (left side, who moved inside from tackle) and David Loverne (rc). Head coach Bill Parcells criticized Beckles' conditioning during his time in New York. Parcells, however, told Beckles he would keep him as a veteran backup to the young guards. Beckles told Parcells, at that point in his career, his heart was not in the game enough to be a reserve.

After being out of football in 1999, Beckles was in camp with the Broncos for approximately one month as a backup to left guard Mark Schlereth in 2000. Beckles had not played any position in the NFL, except right guard, and retired after suffering severe cramping due to dehydration after filling in for Schlereth in practice.

Publishing, Podcasting, and Business Ventures
In addition to his other charitable and private ventures, Beckles was the publisher and editor-in-chief of What's Hot Tampa Bay Magazine, formerly As.I.Be Magazine, and once published his own website "Flavor of Tampa Bay." 

He currently hosts two podcasts, "In the Trenches," where he comments on the Buccaneers and other NFL News, as well as the "Plant Power Podcast," where he interviews movers and shakers in alternative medicine and healing. Beckles is a staunch advocate of marijuana legalization. 

Ian established the Dignitary brand in 2015. His Dignitary Tea and Kava House in South Tampa filled a niche in the South Tampa neighborhood where he currently lives. The establishment’s soulful vibe has attracted many customers from various walks of life, and has become a popular, healthy and safe alternative to bars that sell alcohol. 

His knowledge, integrity and popularity have helped catapult him to an exalted status among retired athletes who have settled in the Tampa Bay area.

References

1967 births
Living people
Sportspeople from Montreal
American sports radio personalities
American football offensive linemen
Indiana Hoosiers football players
Tampa Bay Buccaneers players
Philadelphia Eagles players
Canadian players of American football
Canadian sportspeople of Guyanese descent
Canadian sportspeople of Trinidad and Tobago descent
Waldorf Warriors football players
Anglophone Quebec people
Gridiron football people from Quebec